The 2015–16 Eurocup Basketball knockout stage was played from 23 February to 27 April 2016. A total of 16 teams compete in the knockout stage.

Format
In the knockout stage, teams played against each other over two legs on a home-and-away basis, with the overall cumulative score determining the winner of a round. Thus, the score of one single game can be tied.

The team that finished in the higher Last 32 place will be played the second game of the series at home.
If both teams placed the same in the Last 32, the team with more Last 32 victories will be played the second game at home.
In case of a tie in both place and victories, the team with the higher cumulative Last 32 point difference will be played the second game at home.

Qualified teams

Standings

Bracket

Eighthfinals

The first legs were played on 24 February, and the second legs were played on 1 and 2 March 2016.

|}

First leg

Second leg

Quarterfinals

The first legs were played on 15 and 16 March, and the second legs were played on 22 and 23 March 2016.

|}

First leg

Second leg

Semifinals

The first legs were played on 29 and 30 March, and the second legs were played on 6 April 2016.

|}

First leg

Second leg

Finals

The first leg was played on 22 April, and the second leg was played on 27 April 2016.

 
|}

First leg

Second leg

External links
Official website

2015–16 Eurocup Basketball